The name Tomas has been used for five tropical cyclones worldwide: one in the Atlantic Ocean, two in the Philippines by PAGASA in the Western Pacific Ocean, and two in the South Pacific Ocean.

In the Atlantic:
Hurricane Tomas (2010) – Category 2 hurricane, affected each Caribbean island group

The name Tomas was retired in the Atlantic basin after the 2010 season, and was replaced with Tobias.

In the Western Pacific:
 Tropical Storm Trami (2006) (T0623, 26W, Tomas)
 Typhoon Man-yi (2018) (T1828, 34W, Tomas) – Category 2 typhoon, remained over the open ocean

In the South Pacific:
Cyclone Tomas (1994) – Category 3 tropical cyclone, remained over the open ocean
Cyclone Tomas (2010) – Category 4 tropical cyclone, caused extensive damage in Fiji

The name Tomas was retired in the South Pacific basin after the 2009–10 season and replaced with Troy.

Pacific typhoon set index articles
South Pacific cyclone set index articles
Atlantic hurricane set index articles